The 2017 NCAA Skiing Championships took place from March 8 to March 11 in Franconia, New Hampshire at the Cannon Mountain Ski Area. The tournament went into its 64th consecutive NCAA Skiing Championships, and featured twenty-one teams across all divisions.

Team results

 Note: Top 10 only
 (H): Team from hosting U.S. state

Individual results

 Note: Table does not include consolation
 (H): Individual from hosting U.S. State

References

2018 in American sports
2018 in sports in New Hampshire